Ian Hartland (12 August 1939 – 6 March 1992) was a New Zealand cricketer. He played in sixteen first-class matches for Canterbury from 1960 to 1966.

See also
 List of Canterbury representative cricketers

References

External links
 

1939 births
1992 deaths
New Zealand cricketers
Canterbury cricketers
Cricketers from Christchurch